A pub is a public house or bar.

Pub or PUB may also refer to:

 Pub (Đorđe Balašević album), a 1982 album by Serbian singer-songwriter Đorđe Balašević album
 Pub (Denzil album), a 1994 album by British band Denzil
 PUB (file type), a Microsoft Publisher document file format
 .pub, a Microsoft Publishing file extension
 PUB (Stockholm), a department store in Stockholm
 Princeton University Band, the marching band and pep band of Princeton University
 Public Utilities Board (Singapore), Singapore's national water agency
 Pueblo Memorial Airport, in Colorado, US
 The Principle of uniform boundedness, in mathematics

See also
Pub rock (disambiguation)
Public (disambiguation)
Publix, a supermarket chain
PubMed, a scientific research resource